A general election was held in the Northern Territory, Australia on Saturday 3 December 1983. The result was a landslide victory for the incumbent Country Liberal Party (CLP) under Chief Minister Paul Everingham over the Australian Labor Party (ALP) opposition under Opposition leader Bob Collins.

For this election, the size of the assembly was increased from 19 to 25.

The only independent of the Legislative Assembly, Dawn Lawrie, lost her seat of Nightcliff at this election to the CLP.

Retiring MPs

CLP
Les MacFarlane MLA (Elsey)

Results 

|}

Candidates

Sitting members are listed in bold. Successful candidates are highlighted in the relevant colour. Where there is possible confusion, an asterisk is used.

Post-election pendulum 
The following pendulum is known as the Mackerras pendulum, invented by psephologist Malcolm Mackerras.  The pendulum works by lining up all of the seats held in the Legislative Assembly according to the percentage point margin they are held by on a two-party-preferred basis. This is also known as the swing required for the seat to change hands. Given a uniform swing to the opposition or government parties, the number of seats that change hands can be predicted.

References

Elections in the Northern Territory
1983 elections in Australia
1980s in the Northern Territory
December 1983 events in Australia